Gorsky, Gorskaya (feminine; Горская), or Gorskoye (neuter; Горское) may refer to:

Places
Gorsky (rural locality) (Gorskaya, Gorskoye), name of several rural localities in Russia
Gorskaya railway station, a locality and train station in Sestroretsk, St. Petersburg, Russia
Gorskoye (Hirske), the Russian name for a city in Luhansk, Ukraine

Other uses
Gorsky (surname)
Good luck, Mr. Gorsky, an urban legend about the Apollo 11 moon landing

See also
Górski, Polish surname